Maloakkulayevo (Bäläkäy Aqqolay) is a rural locality (a village) in Kazansky Selsoviet, Alsheyevsky District, Bashkortostan, Russia. The population was 183 as of 2010. There are 2  streets.

Geography 
Maloakkulayevo is located 7 km north of Rayevsky (the district's administrative centre) by road. Staroakkulayevo is the nearest rural locality.

References 

Rural localities in Alsheyevsky District